The Braille pattern dots-123 is a 6-dot braille cell with all three left side dots raised, or an 8-dot braille cell with the top, upper-middle, and lower-middle left dots raised. It is represented by the Unicode code point U+2807, and in Braille ASCII with "L".

Unified Braille

In unified international braille, the braille pattern dots-123 is used to represent a lateral approximant, such as /l/, /ʟ/, or /ʎ/, and is otherwise assigned as needed.

Table of unified braille values

Other braille

Plus dots 7 and 8

Related to Braille pattern dots-123 are Braille patterns 1237, 1238, and 12378, which are used in 8-dot braille systems, such as Gardner-Salinas and Luxembourgish Braille.

Related 8-dot kantenji patterns

In the Japanese kantenji braille, the standard 8-dot Braille patterns 237, 1237, 2347, and 12347 are the patterns related to Braille pattern dots-123, since the two additional dots of kantenji patterns 0123, 1237, and 01237 are placed above the base 6-dot cell, instead of below, as in standard 8-dot braille.

Kantenji using braille patterns 237, 1237, 2347, or 12347

This listing includes kantenji using Braille pattern dots-123 for all 6349 kanji found in JIS C 6226-1978.

  - 水

Variants and thematic compounds

  -  selector 1 + に/氵  =  朮
  -  selector 3 + に/氵  =  奚
  -  selector 4 + に/氵  =  旨
  -  selector 5 + に/氵  =  賈
  -  selector 6 + に/氵  =  丞
  -  に/氵 + selector 3  =  泡
  -  に/氵 + selector 4  =  泳
  -  数 + に/氵  =  壬
  -  比 + に/氵  =  西
  -  宿 + に/氵  =  垂
  -  お/頁 + に/氵  =  鬼

Compounds of 水

  -  と/戸 + に/氵  =  尿
  -  け/犬 + に/氵  =  泰
  -  ら/月 + け/犬 + に/氵  =  滕
  -  氷/氵 + 宿 + に/氵  =  冰
  -  に/氵 + 日 + selector 6  =  沓
  -  み/耳 + に/氵  =  踏
  -  に/氵 + こ/子 + selector 1  =  汞
  -  に/氵 + へ/⺩ + selector 2  =  漿
  -  に/氵 + 日 + を/貝  =  潁
  -  に/氵 + 宿 + ⺼  =  盥
  -  の/禾 + 宿 + に/氵  =  粱
  -  も/門 + 宿 + に/氵  =  閖
  -  と/戸 + み/耳 + に/氵  =  鞜
  -  に/氵 + つ/土  =  塗
  -  に/氵 + ち/竹  =  池
  -  に/氵 + て/扌  =  決
  -  に/氵 + に/氵 + て/扌  =  决
  -  に/氵 + も/門  =  汽
  -  に/氵 + 宿  =  沖
  -  に/氵 + に/氵 + 宿  =  冲
  -  に/氵 + の/禾  =  没
  -  に/氵 + に/氵 + の/禾  =  沒
  -  に/氵 + か/金  =  河
  -  に/氵 + ぬ/力  =  沼
  -  に/氵 + え/訁  =  沿
  -  に/氵 + こ/子  =  法
  -  へ/⺩ + に/氵 + こ/子  =  琺
  -  に/氵 + ひ/辶  =  波
  -  ま/石 + に/氵 + ひ/辶  =  碆
  -  心 + に/氵 + ひ/辶  =  菠
  -  に/氵 + ま/石  =  泣
  -  に/氵 + ま/石 + り/分  =  潼
  -  に/氵 + 仁/亻  =  泥
  -  に/氵 + へ/⺩  =  注
  -  に/氵 + へ/⺩ + selector 1  =  汪
  -  に/氵 + へ/⺩ + し/巿  =  涛
  -  に/氵 + 龸  =  洗
  -  に/氵 + れ/口  =  洛
  -  に/氵 + し/巿  =  洩
  -  に/氵 + せ/食  =  活
  -  も/門 + に/氵 + せ/食  =  濶
  -  に/氵 + く/艹  =  流
  -  に/氵 + 囗  =  浅
  -  に/氵 + り/分  =  浜
  -  に/氵 + ほ/方  =  浦
  -  心 + に/氵 + ほ/方  =  蒲
  -  に/氵 + ほ/方 + selector 1  =  汐
  -  に/氵 + ほ/方 + ぬ/力  =  洌
  -  に/氵 + ほ/方 + 龸  =  淤
  -  に/氵 + や/疒  =  浪
  -  に/氵 + は/辶  =  海
  -  つ/土 + に/氵 + は/辶  =  塰
  -  に/氵 + そ/馬  =  消
  -  に/氵 + け/犬  =  涙
  -  に/氵 + な/亻  =  液
  -  に/氵 + う/宀/#3  =  淑
  -  に/氵 + 火  =  淡
  -  に/氵 + す/発  =  深
  -  に/氵 + 比  =  混
  -  に/氵 + ん/止  =  渋
  -  に/氵 + に/氵 + ん/止  =  澁
  -  に/氵 + ん/止 + お/頁  =  瀕
  -  に/氵 + ゑ/訁  =  渡
  -  に/氵 + ⺼  =  温
  -  心 + に/氵 + ⺼  =  薀
  -  に/氵 + さ/阝  =  港
  -  に/氵 + ら/月  =  湖
  -  に/氵 + 数  =  湯
  -  ⺼ + に/氵 + 数  =  盪
  -  く/艹 + に/氵 + 数  =  蕩
  -  に/氵 + ゆ/彳  =  湾
  -  に/氵 + い/糹/#2  =  湿
  -  に/氵 + め/目  =  満
  -  る/忄 + に/氵 + め/目  =  懣
  -  に/氵 + め/目 + selector 4  =  湎
  -  に/氵 + む/車  =  溝
  -  に/氵 + た/⽥  =  溶
  -  に/氵 + ゐ/幺  =  滋
  -  に/氵 + 心  =  滝
  -  に/氵 + よ/广  =  滞
  -  に/氵 + に/氵 + よ/广  =  滯
  -  に/氵 + お/頁  =  滴
  -  に/氵 + き/木  =  漆
  -  に/氵 + を/貝  =  漸
  -  に/氵 + 日  =  潮
  -  に/氵 + と/戸  =  澄
  -  に/氵 + 氷/氵  =  激
  -  に/氵 + ろ/十  =  濃
  -  た/⽥ + に/氵  =  沢
  -  そ/馬 + に/氵  =  洋
  -  こ/子 + に/氵  =  浩
  -  氷/氵 + に/氵  =  淫
  -  ち/竹 + 氷/氵 + に/氵  =  霪
  -  ん/止 + に/氵  =  渉
  -  ゐ/幺 + に/氵  =  渓
  -  ゐ/幺 + ゐ/幺 + に/氵  =  溪
  -  ひ/辶 + に/氵  =  減
  -  す/発 + に/氵  =  渠
  -  や/疒 + に/氵  =  濯
  -  に/氵 + に/氵 + 囗  =  淺
  -  に/氵 + に/氵 + め/目  =  滿
  -  に/氵 + に/氵 + い/糹/#2  =  濕
  -  に/氵 + に/氵 + り/分  =  濱
  -  に/氵 + に/氵 + 心  =  瀧
  -  に/氵 + に/氵 + ゆ/彳  =  灣
  -  き/木 + 宿 + に/氵  =  梁
  -  に/氵 + 宿 + さ/阝  =  氾
  -  に/氵 + 数 + て/扌  =  汀
  -  に/氵 + 宿 + ろ/十  =  汁
  -  に/氵 + selector 4 + 龸  =  汎
  -  に/氵 + や/疒 + selector 1  =  汕
  -  に/氵 + selector 4 + ゐ/幺  =  汲
  -  に/氵 + は/辶 + ん/止  =  汳
  -  に/氵 + 宿 + り/分  =  汾
  -  に/氵 + 宿 + 心  =  沁
  -  に/氵 + 比 + を/貝  =  沂
  -  に/氵 + 宿 + け/犬  =  沃
  -  に/氵 + 比 + ふ/女  =  沌
  -  に/氵 + 比 + ⺼  =  沍
  -  に/氵 + 宿 + き/木  =  沐
  -  に/氵 + 龸 + ん/止  =  沚
  -  に/氵 + 宿 + し/巿  =  沛
  -  に/氵 + き/木 + selector 5  =  沫
  -  に/氵 + selector 5 + そ/馬  =  沮
  -  に/氵 + 宿 + ひ/辶  =  沱
  -  に/氵 + 宿 + た/⽥  =  沺
  -  に/氵 + れ/口 + ろ/十  =  沽
  -  に/氵 + れ/口 + と/戸  =  沾
  -  に/氵 + ろ/十 + よ/广  =  泄
  -  に/氵 + 囗 + な/亻  =  泅
  -  に/氵 + ゆ/彳 + selector 1  =  泓
  -  に/氵 + 数 + る/忄  =  泗
  -  に/氵 + り/分 + か/金  =  泙
  -  に/氵 + selector 2 + の/禾  =  泛
  -  に/氵 + selector 1 + を/貝  =  泝
  -  に/氵 + 宿 + め/目  =  泪
  -  に/氵 + み/耳 + ん/止  =  泯
  -  に/氵 + け/犬 + お/頁  =  泱
  -  に/氵 + selector 5 + か/金  =  洙
  -  に/氵 + 囗 + と/戸  =  洞
  -  に/氵 + ゆ/彳 + な/亻  =  洟
  -  に/氵 + selector 4 + こ/子  =  洪
  -  に/氵 + selector 1 + ⺼  =  洫
  -  に/氵 + か/金 + selector 4  =  洲
  -  に/氵 + ふ/女 + れ/口  =  洳
  -  に/氵 + 日 + す/発  =  洵
  -  に/氵 + も/門 + selector 6  =  洶
  -  に/氵 + 龸 + selector 2  =  洸
  -  に/氵 + り/分 + 囗  =  洽
  -  に/氵 + て/扌 + を/貝  =  浙
  -  に/氵 + 龸 + む/車  =  浚
  -  に/氵 + う/宀/#3 + 宿  =  浣
  -  に/氵 + 比 + り/分  =  浬
  -  に/氵 + 宿 + な/亻  =  浹
  -  に/氵 + 宿 + つ/土  =  涅
  -  に/氵 + 龸 + つ/土  =  涌
  -  に/氵 + は/辶 + selector 1  =  涎
  -  に/氵 + 龸 + ら/月  =  涓
  -  に/氵 + ゆ/彳 + 宿  =  涕
  -  に/氵 + つ/土 + を/貝  =  涜
  -  に/氵 + 囗 + ろ/十  =  涸
  -  に/氵 + う/宀/#3 + よ/广  =  淀
  -  に/氵 + き/木 + お/頁  =  淅
  -  に/氵 + め/目 + ⺼  =  淆
  -  に/氵 + selector 4 + き/木  =  淇
  -  に/氵 + き/木 + き/木  =  淋
  -  に/氵 + selector 6 + は/辶  =  淌
  -  に/氵 + ふ/女 + さ/阝  =  淒
  -  に/氵 + う/宀/#3 + む/車  =  淕
  -  に/氵 + 宿 + と/戸  =  淘
  -  に/氵 + う/宀/#3 + ね/示  =  淙
  -  に/氵 + 心 + こ/子  =  淞
  -  に/氵 + 宿 + る/忄  =  淪
  -  に/氵 + お/頁 + ろ/十  =  淬
  -  に/氵 + 宿 + い/糹/#2  =  淮
  -  に/氵 + 宿 + ぬ/力  =  淵
  -  に/氵 + selector 6 + 心  =  淹
  -  に/氵 + に/氵 + 囗  =  淺
  -  に/氵 + う/宀/#3 + ぬ/力  =  渊
  -  に/氵 + 龸 + ぬ/力  =  渕
  -  に/氵 + 龸 + ⺼  =  渙
  -  に/氵 + と/戸 + 日  =  渚
  -  に/氵 + 龸 + ゆ/彳  =  渝
  -  に/氵 + selector 6 + て/扌  =  渟
  -  に/氵 + き/木 + 日  =  渣
  -  に/氵 + ぬ/力 + ろ/十  =  渤
  -  に/氵 + と/戸 + ゆ/彳  =  渥
  -  に/氵 + 宿 + か/金  =  渦
  -  に/氵 + 宿 + よ/广  =  渫
  -  に/氵 + た/⽥ + ⺼  =  渭
  -  に/氵 + 比 + か/金  =  渮
  -  に/氵 + は/辶 + selector 3  =  游
  -  に/氵 + ほ/方 + そ/馬  =  渺
  -  に/氵 + 宿 + む/車  =  渾
  -  に/氵 + は/辶 + い/糹/#2  =  湃
  -  に/氵 + け/犬 + け/犬  =  湊
  -  に/氵 + 宿 + の/禾  =  湍
  -  に/氵 + き/木 + め/目  =  湘
  -  に/氵 + selector 1 + き/木  =  湛
  -  に/氵 + 日 + へ/⺩  =  湟
  -  に/氵 + ぬ/力 + た/⽥  =  湧
  -  に/氵 + の/禾 + 火  =  湫
  -  に/氵 + 宿 + 仁/亻  =  湲
  -  に/氵 + 日 + 氷/氵  =  湶
  -  に/氵 + き/木 + ぬ/力  =  溂
  -  に/氵 + 宿 + す/発  =  溌
  -  に/氵 + よ/广 + も/門  =  溏
  -  に/氵 + つ/土 + こ/子  =  溘
  -  に/氵 + ら/月 + た/⽥  =  溜
  -  に/氵 + 龸 + 日  =  溟
  -  に/氵 + selector 4 + て/扌  =  溥
  -  に/氵 + ら/月 + は/辶  =  溯
  -  に/氵 + 宿 + え/訁  =  溲
  -  に/氵 + 宿 + 囗  =  溷
  -  に/氵 + ゆ/彳 + ゆ/彳  =  溺
  -  に/氵 + し/巿 + ろ/十  =  溽
  -  に/氵 + 宿 + ほ/方  =  滂
  -  に/氵 + り/分 + お/頁  =  滄
  -  に/氵 + す/発 + き/木  =  滌
  -  に/氵 + う/宀/#3 + ま/石  =  滓
  -  に/氵 + 囗 + ひ/辶  =  滬
  -  に/氵 + selector 1 + う/宀/#3  =  滲
  -  に/氵 + ん/止 + selector 2  =  滷
  -  に/氵 + え/訁 + そ/馬  =  滸
  -  に/氵 + 宿 + 龸  =  滾
  -  に/氵 + に/氵 + め/目  =  滿
  -  に/氵 + そ/馬 + 比  =  漉
  -  に/氵 + selector 4 + い/糹/#2  =  漓
  -  に/氵 + 宿 + そ/馬  =  漕
  -  に/氵 + 宿 + く/艹  =  漠
  -  に/氵 + ひ/辶 + む/車  =  漣
  -  に/氵 + 宿 + ん/止  =  漱
  -  に/氵 + ゆ/彳 + と/戸  =  漲
  -  に/氵 + の/禾 + た/⽥  =  潘
  -  に/氵 + 龸 + ろ/十  =  潦
  -  に/氵 + れ/口 + し/巿  =  潯
  -  に/氵 + 宿 + を/貝  =  潰
  -  に/氵 + け/犬 + り/分  =  潴
  -  に/氵 + ら/月 + 氷/氵  =  潸
  -  に/氵 + 宿 + こ/子  =  潺
  -  に/氵 + う/宀/#3 + ん/止  =  澀
  -  に/氵 + 宿 + や/疒  =  澂
  -  に/氵 + selector 6 + つ/土  =  澆
  -  に/氵 + 宿 + う/宀/#3  =  澎
  -  に/氵 + 宿 + ら/月  =  澗
  -  に/氵 + れ/口 + う/宀/#3  =  澡
  -  に/氵 + ろ/十 + か/金  =  澣
  -  た/⽥ + た/⽥ + に/氵  =  澤
  -  に/氵 + ち/竹 + ん/止  =  澪
  -  に/氵 + こ/子 + の/禾  =  澱
  -  に/氵 + 囗 + の/禾  =  澳
  -  に/氵 + 宿 + 日  =  澹
  -  に/氵 + よ/广 + け/犬  =  濂
  -  に/氵 + 宿 + ふ/女  =  濆
  -  に/氵 + 囗 + め/目  =  濔
  -  に/氵 + に/氵 + い/糹/#2  =  濕
  -  に/氵 + 宿 + て/扌  =  濘
  -  に/氵 + 龸 + そ/馬  =  濠
  -  に/氵 + 龸 + め/目  =  濬
  -  に/氵 + な/亻 + な/亻  =  濮
  -  に/氵 + に/氵 + り/分  =  濱
  -  に/氵 + お/頁 + 囗  =  濺
  -  に/氵 + す/発 + 心  =  濾
  -  に/氵 + そ/馬 + や/疒  =  瀁
  -  に/氵 + 宿 + selector 1  =  瀉
  -  に/氵 + う/宀/#3 + の/禾  =  瀋
  -  に/氵 + 龸 + か/金  =  瀏
  -  に/氵 + 日 + こ/子  =  瀑
  -  に/氵 + 龸 + た/⽥  =  瀘
  -  に/氵 + ろ/十 + む/車  =  瀚
  -  に/氵 + selector 5 + ほ/方  =  瀛
  -  に/氵 + こ/子 + ん/止  =  瀝
  -  に/氵 + せ/食 + 宿  =  瀞
  -  に/氵 + ぬ/力 + ゆ/彳  =  瀟
  -  に/氵 + に/氵 + 心  =  瀧
  -  に/氵 + り/分 + 氷/氵  =  瀲
  -  に/氵 + も/門 + ひ/辶  =  瀾
  -  に/氵 + 囗 + 比  =  灑
  -  に/氵 + く/艹 + い/糹/#2  =  灘
  -  に/氵 + に/氵 + ゆ/彳  =  灣
  -  心 + 宿 + に/氵  =  藻
  -  く/艹 + 宿 + に/氵  =  蘯
  -  ち/竹 + 宿 + に/氵  =  霑
  -  に/氵 + 宿 + せ/食  =  鴻

Compounds of 朮

  -  は/辶 + に/氵  =  述
  -  ろ/十 + に/氵  =  求
  -  へ/⺩ + に/氵  =  球
  -  ね/示 + ろ/十 + に/氵  =  裘
  -  ひ/辶 + ろ/十 + に/氵  =  逑
  -  selector 4 + へ/⺩ + に/氵  =  毬

Compounds of 旨

  -  て/扌 + に/氵  =  指
  -  ⺼ + に/氵  =  脂
  -  ゑ/訁 + に/氵  =  詣
  -  と/戸 + selector 4 + に/氵  =  耆
  -  龸 + 宿 + に/氵  =  嘗
  -  せ/食 + 宿 + に/氵  =  鮨

Compounds of 賈

  -  な/亻 + な/亻 + に/氵  =  價

Compounds of 丞

  -  く/艹 + に/氵  =  蒸
  -  て/扌 + selector 6 + に/氵  =  拯
  -  に/氵 + 囗 + ま/石  =  涵

Compounds of 泡

  -  く/艹 + に/氵 + selector 3  =  萢

Compounds of 壬

  -  仁/亻 + に/氵  =  任
  -  を/貝 + に/氵  =  賃
  -  ふ/女 + 仁/亻 + に/氵  =  姙
  -  る/忄 + 仁/亻 + に/氵  =  恁
  -  心 + 仁/亻 + に/氵  =  荏
  -  ね/示 + 仁/亻 + に/氵  =  袵
  -  ふ/女 + に/氵  =  妊
  -  ね/示 + 数 + に/氵  =  衽
  -  ふ/女 + 数 + に/氵  =  婬

Compounds of 西

  -  selector 1 + 比 + に/氵  =  襾
  -  な/亻 + に/氵  =  価
  -  日 + に/氵  =  晒
  -  心 + に/氵  =  栗
  -  心 + に/氵 + ね/示  =  瓢
  -  ち/竹 + 心 + に/氵  =  篥
  -  る/忄 + に/氵  =  慄
  -  せ/食 + に/氵  =  酒
  -  に/氵 + ね/示  =  票
  -  き/木 + に/氵  =  標
  -  に/氵 + に/氵  =  漂
  -  ぬ/力 + に/氵 + ね/示  =  剽
  -  ふ/女 + に/氵 + ね/示  =  嫖
  -  る/忄 + に/氵 + ね/示  =  慓
  -  い/糹/#2 + に/氵 + ね/示  =  縹
  -  む/車 + に/氵 + ね/示  =  飄
  -  そ/馬 + に/氵 + ね/示  =  驃
  -  せ/食 + に/氵 + ね/示  =  鰾
  -  む/車 + 宿 + に/氵  =  飃
  -  に/氵 + ふ/女  =  要
  -  火 + に/氵  =  煙
  -  れ/口 + 比 + に/氵  =  哂
  -  つ/土 + 比 + に/氵  =  堙
  -  は/辶 + 比 + に/氵  =  廼
  -  き/木 + 比 + に/氵  =  栖
  -  に/氵 + 比 + に/氵  =  湮
  -  か/金 + 比 + に/氵  =  甄
  -  ひ/辶 + 比 + に/氵  =  迺
  -  に/氵 + 宿 + に/氵  =  洒
  -  に/氵 + 日 + ろ/十  =  潭
  -  に/氵 + 宿 + 氷/氵  =  覈
  -  に/氵 + う/宀/#3 + そ/馬  =  覊

Compounds of 垂

  -  め/目 + に/氵  =  睡
  -  さ/阝 + に/氵  =  郵
  -  か/金 + に/氵  =  錘
  -  れ/口 + 宿 + に/氵  =  唾
  -  て/扌 + 宿 + に/氵  =  捶
  -  さ/阝 + 宿 + に/氵  =  陲

Compounds of 鬼

  -  つ/土 + に/氵  =  塊
  -  え/訁 + に/氵  =  魂
  -  よ/广 + に/氵  =  魔
  -  な/亻 + お/頁 + に/氵  =  傀
  -  や/疒 + お/頁 + に/氵  =  嵬
  -  る/忄 + お/頁 + に/氵  =  愧
  -  心 + お/頁 + に/氵  =  槐
  -  へ/⺩ + お/頁 + に/氵  =  瑰
  -  く/艹 + お/頁 + に/氵  =  蒐
  -  さ/阝 + お/頁 + に/氵  =  隗
  -  せ/食 + お/頁 + に/氵  =  餽
  -  日 + お/頁 + に/氵  =  魄
  -  の/禾 + お/頁 + に/氵  =  魏
  -  よ/广 + お/頁 + に/氵  =  魘

Other compounds

  -  も/門 + に/氵  =  匂
  -  れ/口 + に/氵  =  嗜
  -  う/宀/#3 + に/氵  =  窪
  -  の/禾 + に/氵  =  粍
  -  ゆ/彳 + に/氵  =  術
  -  ほ/方 + に/氵 + の/禾  =  歿
  -  宿 + 宿 + に/氵  =  埀

Notes

Braille patterns